Solimonas flava is a Gram-negative, rod-shaped and non-motile bacterium from the genus of Solimonas which has been isolated from polluted soil from Jiangsu in China.

References

Bacteria described in 2008
Gammaproteobacteria